Anna Karenina is a 1997 American period drama film written and directed by Bernard Rose and starring Sophie Marceau, Sean Bean, Alfred Molina, Mia Kirshner and James Fox. Based on the 1878 novel of the same name by Leo Tolstoy, the film is about a young and beautiful married woman who meets a handsome count, with whom she falls in love. Eventually, the conflict between her passionate desires and painful social realities leads to depression and despair.

The film is the only international version filmed entirely in Russia, at locations in Saint Petersburg and Moscow.

Plot 
Anna Karenina is the young and elegant wife of Alexei Karenin, a wealthy Russian nobleman twenty years her senior. She is unhappy and lives only for their son, Seriozha. During a ball in Moscow, she encounters the handsome Count Alexei Vronsky. Vronsky is instantly smitten and follows her to St. Petersburg, pursuing her shamelessly. Eventually, Anna surrenders to her feelings for him and becomes his mistress. Though they are happy together, their relationship soon crumbles after she miscarries his child. Karenin is deeply touched by her pain and agrees to forgive her. However, Anna remains unhappy and, to the scandal of respectable society, she openly leaves her husband for Vronsky.

Using her brother as an intermediary, Anna hopelessly begs her husband for a divorce. Karenin, under the poisonous influence of Anna's friend the Countess Lydia Ivanovna, indignantly refuses to divorce and denies her any access to Seriozha. Distraught by the loss of her son, Anna grows severely depressed and self-medicates with laudanum. Before long, she is hopelessly addicted. With Vronsky she has another child, but he is also torn between his love for Anna and the temptation of a respectable marriage in the eyes of society. Anna becomes certain that Vronsky is about to leave her and marry a younger woman. She travels to the railway station and commits suicide by jumping in front of a train.

Vronsky is emotionally devastated by her death and volunteers for a 'suicide mission' in the Balkan war. While travelling to join his regiment, he encounters Konstantin Levin at the train station. Levin has married Vronsky's former (and unrequited) sweetheart, Princess "Kitty" Shcherbatskaya. Levin attempts to persuade Vronsky of the value of life. Vronsky is despondent, and can only speak of how Anna's body looked at the railway station when he arrived to see her. They separate, and Levin watches the train depart, certain that he will never see again Vronsky.

Levin returns to his family. At home, he writes the events of everything that happened, and signs his manuscript: "Leo Tolstoy".

Cast

Production 
The production was started with help from Mel Gibson, who was approached by Sophie Marceau, and initiated the main budget of about $20 million coming from his company Icon Productions. Casting was done by Marion Dougherty, casting director of Warner Bros. Studios. Screenplay was written by British writer/director Bernard Rose. The film was a joint production by Icon Productions and Warner Bros. with participation of Lenfilm studios in Saint Petersburg and Trite Studios in Moscow.

The film shows international cast of leading actors: French Sophie Marceau, British Sean Bean, Alfred Molina and James Fox, American Danny Huston, Canadian Mia Kirshner and others. Several Russian actors are cast in supporting roles. Most crew members came from the UK and the US, some additional crew was hired from Trite Studio and the Lenfilm Studios in St. Petersburg, Russia. Filming was done entirely in Russia between February and August 1996. Main filming locations were in St. Petersburg, at the palaces of Russian Tsars and historic mansions of Russian Nobility, such as The Winter Palace, Peterhof, Menshikov Palace, Yusupov Palace, Nevsky Prospekt and other landmark locations. Two minor scenes were filmed in Moscow, Russia.

Post-production 
Post-production was carried out partially in Europe, with the studio version editing being completed in the USA. The original director's cut was not released; it was reduced from 140 minutes to 108 minutes and distributed internationally by Warner Bros. The US theatrical premiere was in April 1997, followed by the European premiere in May 1997. Several DVD editions in Europe are variants of this title: "Tolstoi's Anna Karenina" and "Leo Tolstoi's Anna Karenina" and may vary in film running time from 104 to 108 minutes.

Music 

Music by Tchaikovsky, Rachmaninov, and Prokofiev was recorded in performance by the St. Petersburg Philharmonic Orchestra under the baton of Sir Georg Solti. The score was recorded in The St Petersburg Philharmonic Hall, where Tchaikovsky's Symphony No. 6, "Pathetique" first premiered. Incidentally, this symphony is played most prominently in key scenes from the film. Director Bernard Rose and Sir Georg Solti both agreed that the Symphony bore parallels with Anna Karenina's story, mainly for the music's excessively tragic tones and Anna's melancholy. The film's score was composed by Stewart Copeland.

Reception 
Rotten Tomatoes gives the film a score of 26% based on reviews from 19 critics, with an average rating of 4.70/10.

Roger Ebert of the Chicago Sun-Times gave the film 1 and a half stars out of 4, saying "There is much more to Tolstoy's story—but not in this bloodless and shallow adaptation. Bernard Rose is a director of talent (his "Paperhouse" was a visionary film, and his "Immortal Beloved" was a biopic that brought great passion to the story of Beethoven). Here, shooting on fabulous locations, he seems to have lost track of his characters. The movie is like a storyboard for "Anna Karenina with the life and subtlety still to be added."
Stephen Holden of The New York Times'' called it a "sleek, cliffs notes version of a masterpiece" criticizing it for being "glossy and picture perfect on the surface and hollow at the core." Todd McCarthy of Variety wrote: "this effort is handsome thanks to the matchless locations, in this case those in and around St. Petersburg, opulent costumes and good-looking cast. But there is no dramatic urgency here and little more emotional resonance, problems that stem jointly from the adaptation, direction and casting."

References

External links 
 
 
 
 
 Selection of Cast Photographs: Petr Shelokhonov, Russian actor. "Anna Karenina", Petr Shelokhonov, Russian actor. "Anna Karenina", Petr Shelokhonov, Russian actor. "Anna Karenina", Petr Shelokhonov, Russian actor. "Anna Karenina"

1997 films
1997 romantic drama films
American romantic drama films
Icon Productions films
1990s Russian-language films
Films based on Anna Karenina
Films shot in Russia
Warner Bros. films
Films directed by Bernard Rose (director)
Films about infidelity
Films produced by Bruce Davey
Films scored by Stewart Copeland
Films set in the 19th century
American historical films
1990s historical films
Films with screenplays by Bernard Rose (director)
1990s English-language films
1990s American films